Robert Sidney Bowen, Jr. (October 4, 1900 – April 11, 1977) was a World War I aviator, newspaper journalist, magazine editor and author who was born in Boston, Massachusetts, and died of cancer in Honolulu, Hawaii, at the age of 76. He is best known for his boys' series books written during World War II, the Dave Dawson War Adventure Series and the Red Randall Series. He also worked under the name R. Sidney Bowen and under the pseudonym James Robert Richard.

Life

Before becoming an author
Robert Sidney Bowen was born in Allston, Massachusetts to Robert Sidney and Catharine Sinclair (Fenton) Bowen. His grandfather, Charles F. Bowen, fought in the Fifth Massachusetts Volunteer Infantry during the American Civil War. Bowen attended the Newton High School at Newton, Massachusetts. After World War I broke out in Europe, Bowen left school to drive an ambulance for the American Field Service (AFS) in France. In May 1917, the United States Army Ambulance Service took over the AFS, and Bowen, being underage to serve, returned to the United States. When he turned seventeen, he signed up in October 1917 with the Great Britain's Royal Flying Corps in recruiting office in New York City as a Flight Cadet. He went through several phases of training, including basic military training, ground instruction, and flight instruction at Training Depot Stations (TDS), in different locations, first, at Toronto University, then at Camp Mohawk, Deseronto, Canada, at Camp Leaside, Beamsville, Canada, and at Camp Taliaferro, Fort Worth, Texas. According to The London Gazette, Bowen was granted a temporary commission as a Second Lieutenant in the Royal Air Force on June 20, 1918.

In July 1918, he went overseas to England, and was assigned to the 84th Squadron, R.A.F. fighting in France on SE5 fighter aircraft. He saw limited air combat over France but achieved no  victories documented by the authorities, despite claims of shooting down two enemy airplanes on the eve of the Armistice. He wrote to his family, "I reported my flight, but it was hard lines for me because I have no idea where the German planes went down and therefore they can't be credited as official... My bus has 33 bullet holes in it and three in my flying suit, which shows I was in some close action." After the end of hostilities at the Western Front, Bowen transferred to the United States Army Air Service.

After the war, Bowen began working as a journalist for the London Daily Mail, the Paris edition of the Chicago Tribune, and two Boston newspapers. For several years (until the 1930s), he was editor-in-chief of Aviation Magazine. He also worked as an editor for Flying News and several motor magazines.

As an author
Bowen turned to writing in 1930, using his prestige as editor-in-chief of Aviation Magazine to write Flying From The Ground Up, a non-fiction work on how to fly an airplane. He began freelancing for pulp magazines. In 1934, he headlined his own pulp magazine, Dusty Ayres and His Battle Birds, for Popular Publications. Twelve issues were released, the first ten published monthly from July 1934 through April 1935. Bowen continued writing for mystery, adventure, sports, and aviation pulp magazines through the 1950s.

After the invasion of Poland by Germany in 1939 sparked World War II, Crown Publishers called Bowen, asking for an adventure story based on the war. The Dave Dawson series , also known as the War Adventure series, was the result. Bowen got to work immediately, and the first book, Dave Dawson At Dunkirk, was published in 1941. A total of 15 volumes were released between 1941 and 1946.

By 1945 the series had sold over 2,000,000 copies. Bowen was earning 2 cents per copy sold, netting him nearly $10,000 a year. All volumes, except for the scarce final volume, were subsequently reprinted (with cheaper quality and prices) by Saalfield Publishers in Akron, Ohio.

Inspired by the success of the Dave Dawson books, Crown's competing publisher Grosset & Dunlap hired Bowen to write a similar series for them. The Red Randall series debuted in 1944, selling  200,000 copies its first year.

During this time, Bowen lived in Wilton, Connecticut, writing seven days a week, from 9 to 5, in an office that he rented over an old garage. He averaged 10,000 words per day, and could complete a novel in ten days. He also never revised his work, believing that any tampering with the story would ruin it.

After the war, Bowen turned to writing books aimed toward adolescent boys, on topics such as aviation, cars, and baseball. He also began writing books about horses under the pseudonym James Robert Richard. Most of the books he wrote during this period were published by Lothrop, Lee & Shepard. Many of his baseball books were later reprinted by Grosset & Dunlap in their series of "Famous Sports Stories." Most of his other books were published by Chilton, Whitman Publishing, Criterion.

Robert Sidney Bowen and his second wife, MaryAnn (MacIntyre) Bowen, had two sons, James Sinclair Bowen and Richard Fenton Bowen, and one daughter, Virginia Bowen, and, at the time of his death, five grandchildren, Katherine Ann Bowen, Thomas Robert Bowen, Cheryl L. Bowen, Wayne Tucker, and Linda. Robert Sidney Bowen was first married to Marjorie Percy Bowen and had a son Robert Watson Bowen who has three children Greg, Jennifer and Beth.

Partial bibliography

Series Books

Dusty Ayres And His Battle Birds

Dave Dawson War Adventure Series

Red Randall Series

Non-Series Books

Using Real Name

Using pseudonym James Robert Richard

In Periodicals
 Enough’s Too Much, (short story) War Stories June 1927
 For Men Only, (short story) Munsey’s Magazine July 1927
 A Gashly Experience, (short story) War Stories #11, August 19 1927
 High Odds, (short story) War Stories #13, September 15 1927
 “Gimme That Dough!”, (short story) War Stories #16, October 27 1927
 From Midnight Clouds, (short story) War Stories #20, December 22 1927
 Sherman Was All Wrong, (short story) War Novels #1, February 1928
 Gurgling Wings, (short story) War Birds #1, March 1928
 Too Much Gas, (short story) War Birds #3, May 1928
 That Paris Glide, (short story) War Birds #6, August 1928
 Here’s How, (short story) Over the Top October 1928
 A Hero by Request, (short story) Over the Top November 1928
 The Dawn of Death, (novelette) World War Stories April 1929
 Cockpit Flying Course, (article) Flying Aces January 1930, etc.
 Death Flies the Mail, (novelette) Sky Birds April 1930
 Five to One, (short story) Sky Riders #20, June 1930
 “Dive, Major, Dive!”, (short story) Sky Riders #22, August 1930
 The Roving Squadron, (short story) Flying Aces August 1930
 The Flying Frankfurt, (short story) War Birds #33, September 1930
 Crazy’s Camouflaged Camel, (short story) Battle Aces November 1930
 Wrong Hunch, (short story) Sky Riders #25, November 1930
 Wing to Wing, (short story) Airplane Stories December 1930
 “Shorty” Takes a Dive, (short story) Battle Aces January 1931
 Diving for the Devil, (short story) Airplane Stories March 1931
 Rat Poison, (short story) Gang World March 1931
 The Sky Scorcher, (short story) Sky Birds April 1931
 Dead Men’s Shoes to Fill, (short story) Gang World May 1931
 The Death Spin, (short story) Battle Aces May 1931
 The Chiseler Trap, (short story) Gang World June 1931
 Gallant Enemy, (novelette) War Birds #43, June 1931
 The Midnight Patrol, (short story) Battle Aces June 1931
 The Bomb Yanker, (short story) Battle Aces July 1931
 Last Flight, (novelette) Battle Aces August 1931
 No Guns, (short story) War Birds #45, August 1931
 Throw It in the River, (short story) War Aces #17, August 1931
 Death Goes Solo, (short story) Battle Aces September 1931
 Pants for Pilots, (short story) War Birds #47, October 1931
 Crazy as Hell, (short story) War Birds #48, November 1931
 The Pilot from Hell, (short story) Battle Aces November 1931
 Death Takes the Stick, (short story) War Aces #21, December 1931
 The Vanished Patrol, (short story) Battle Aces December 1931
 Hell’s Ace, (short story) Battle Aces January 1932
 The Shadow of Death, (short story) Gang World January 1932
 The Graveyard of Hell, (short story) Battle Aces February 1932
 Murder by Proxy, (short story) Gang World February 1932
 The Cobra Killer, (short story) Gang World March 1932
 Satan’s Blockade, (short story) Dare-Devil Aces March 1932
 The Suicide Squadron, (short story) Battle Aces March 1932
 The Break, (short story) War Birds #53, April 1932
 Bullet Proof, (short story) Gang World April 1932
 The Devil’s Aces, (short story) Battle Aces April 1932
 The Vanishing Squadrons, (short story) Dare-Devil Aces April 1932
 Dicks Are Dumb, (short story) Gang World May 1932
 The Enemy Is Crazy, (short story) War Aces #26, May 1932
 Pilots Must Eat, (short story) War Birds #54, May 1932
 Alibi Buster, (short story) Gang World June 1932
 Bullets Don’t Win, (short story) War Birds #55, June 1932
 The Devil’s Pilot, (short story) Dare-Devil Aces June 1932
 Flight of the Skulls, (short story) Battle Aces June 1932
 Butterfly Blood, (short story) Sky Fighters July 1932
 The Dead Die Twice, (short story) Gang World July 1932
 The Flaming Eagle, (short story) Dare-Devil Aces July 1932
 The Flying Corpse, (short story) Battle Aces July 1932
 Nails for Sky Coffins, (short story) Sky Fighters August 1932
 Patrol of the Vulture, (short story) Dare-Devil Aces August 1932
 Prop to Prop, (short story) Sky Birds August 1932
 Phantom Triggers, (short story) Gang World September 1932
 The Scarlet Fokker, (short story) Dare-Devil Aces September 1932
 The Death Drome, (short story) Battle Aces October 1932
 How the War Crates Flew, (column) Sky Fighters October 1932, etc.
 They All Squeal, (short story) Gang World October 1932
 The Bronco Patrol, (short story) Battle Aces November 1932
 The Flying Panther, (short story) Dare-Devil Aces November 1932
 Trigger Treason, (short story) Gang World November 1932
 The Flying Mongrels, (short story) Battle Birds December 1932
 Hell’s C.O., (short story) Battle Aces December 1932
 Suicide Drome, (short story) Dare-Devil Aces December 1932
 Cloud Worms, (short story) Battle Birds January 1933
 The One-Ace Squadron, (short story) Dare-Devil Aces January 1933
 The Grenadine Ace, (short story) War Birds #59, February 1933
 The Looping Lunatic, (short story) Dare-Devil Aces February 1933
 Suicide Squadron, (short story) Battle Birds February 1933
 The Conquering Camel, (short story) Sky Fighters March 1933
 The Flaming Comet, (short story) Dare-Devil Aces March 1933
 Flying Justice, (short story) The Blue Book Magazine March 1933
 Pilot’s Luck, (short story) War Birds #60, March 1933
 The Red Ace, (short story) Battle Birds March 1933
 Dizzy Doings, (article) Sky Fighters April 1933
 Squadron of the Damned, (short story) Dare-Devil Aces April 1933
 Too Dumb to Die, (short story) Sky Fighters April 1933
 Killer’s Patrol, (short story) Battle Birds May 1933
 The Pirate Squadron, (short story) Dare-Devil Aces May 1933
 Flight of the Vigilantes, (short story) Dare-Devil Aces June 1933
 Formation Flying, (article) Sky Fighters June 1933
 The Million Dollar Ace, (short story) Battle Birds June 1933
 Iron-Fisted, (short story) Dare-Devil Aces July 1933
 The Thirteenth C.O., (short story) Battle Birds July 1933
 Combat Flying, (column) George Bruce’s Contact August 1933, etc.
 Dynamite Peelot, (short story) Dare-Devil Aces August 1933
 Flight of the Derelicts, (short story) Battle Birds August 1933
 The Neutral Nemesis, (novelette) Flying Aces August 1933
 Without Gloves, (short story) War Birds #65, August 1933
 The Colonel Couldn’t Take It, (short story) George Bruce’s Squadron September 1933
 The Shanghaied Squadron, (short story) Battle Birds September 1933
 Snipe Bait, (short story) Dare-Devil Aces September 1933
 After the Ball, (short story) All Detective Magazine October 1933
 Cutthroat Buzzards, (short story) Battle Birds October 1933
 The Floating Runt, (short story) G-8 and His Battle Aces October 1933
 Strangers’ Squadron, (short story) Dare-Devil Aces October 1933
 Claws of the Condor, (short story) War Birds #68, November 1933
 Patrol of the Silent Death, (short story) Dare-Devil Aces November 1933
 The Phantom Bomber, (short story) Battle Birds November 1933
 The Come-Back Ace, (short story) Dare-Devil Aces December 1933
 The Mercedes Maniacs, (novelette) Battle Birds December 1933
 The Prop Buster, (short story) War Birds #69, December 1933
 The All-American Ace, (short story) Dare-Devil Aces January 1934
 The Convict Patrol, (novelette) Battle Birds January 1934
 Night Flying, (article) Sky Fighters January 1934
 Silent Vickers, (short story) Sky Fighters January 1934
 Flight of the Ape-Men, (novelette) Battle Birds February 1934
 Guns and Howitzers, (article) Sky Fighters February 1934
 The Fokker Firebrand, (short story) Dare-Devil Aces March 1934
 Scavenger Squadron, (short story) Battle Birds March 1934
 Drum Fire, (short story) All Detective Magazine April 1934
 Murder Mercedes, (short story) Battle Birds April 1934
 The Zooming Zebra, (short story) Dare-Devil Aces April 1934
 Death Goes Backstage, (short story) All Detective Magazine May 1934
 The Hanging Squadron, (short story) Battle Birds May 1934
 The Sing-Sing Ace, (novella) Dare-Devil Aces May 1934
 The Haunted Hangar, (short story) Battle Birds June 1934
 Black Lightning! [Dusty Ayres; Fire-Eyes], (novella) Dusty Ayres and His Battle Birds July 1934
 The C.O.’s Coffin [Dusty Ayres], (short story) Dusty Ayres and His Battle Birds July 1934
 The Smoke-Screen Ace [Dusty Ayres], (short story) Dusty Ayres and His Battle Birds July 1934
 Crimson Doom [Dusty Ayres; Fire-Eyes], (novella) Dusty Ayres and His Battle Birds August 1934
 The Death Bomber [Dusty Ayres], (short story) Dusty Ayres and His Battle Birds August 1934
 The Floating Phantom [Dusty Ayres], (short story) Dusty Ayres and His Battle Birds August 1934
 The Silver Caterpillar [Dusty Ayres], (short story) Dusty Ayres and His Battle Birds August 1934
 Dynamite Decoy [Dusty Ayres], (novelette) Dusty Ayres and His Battle Birds September 1934
 The Invisible Raider [Dusty Ayres], (short story) Dusty Ayres and His Battle Birds September 1934
 Jobless Works Overtime, (short story) All Detective Magazine September 1934
 The Purple Tornado [Dusty Ayres; Fire-Eyes], (novella) Dusty Ayres and His Battle Birds September 1934
 The Rough Water Ace [Dusty Ayres], (short story) Dusty Ayres and His Battle Birds October 1934
 The Screaming Eye [Dusty Ayres; Fire-Eyes], (novella) Dusty Ayres and His Battle Birds October 1934
 Vanishing Vultures [Dusty Ayres], (novelette) Dusty Ayres and His Battle Birds October 1934
 The Cockpit Killer [Dusty Ayres], (short story) Dusty Ayres and His Battle Birds November 1934
 The Green Thunderbolt [Dusty Ayres; Fire-Eyes], (novel) Dusty Ayres and His Battle Birds November 1934
 The Ten Dollar Ace [Dusty Ayres], (short story) Dusty Ayres and His Battle Birds November 1934
 Drifting Death [Dusty Ayres], (short story) Dusty Ayres and His Battle Birds December 1934
 The Phantom Army [Dusty Ayres], (short story) Dusty Ayres and His Battle Birds December 1934
 The Red Destroyer [Dusty Ayres; Fire-Eyes], (novel) Dusty Ayres and His Battle Birds December 1934
 Wings for a Fledgling, (short story) War Birds #81, December 1934
 Flying Rawhide [Dusty Ayres], (short story) Dusty Ayres and His Battle Birds January 1935
 Nobody’s Ace [Dusty Ayres], (short story) Dusty Ayres and His Battle Birds January 1935
 The Purple Patrol, (short story) Dare-Devil Aces January 1935
 The White Death [Dusty Ayres; Fire-Eyes], (novel) Dusty Ayres and His Battle Birds January 1935
 The Black Avenger [Dusty Ayres; Fire-Eyes], (novel) Dusty Ayres and His Battle Birds February 1935
 Hell’s Admiral [Dusty Ayres], (short story) Dusty Ayres and His Battle Birds February 1935
 The Thirteenth Ace, (short story) Dare-Devil Aces February 1935
 The Vertical Vulture [Dusty Ayres], (short story) Dusty Ayres and His Battle Birds February 1935
 Black Magic [Dusty Ayres], (short story) Dusty Ayres and His Battle Birds March 1935
 Pinch-Hitting Ace [Dusty Ayres], (short story) Dusty Ayres and His Battle Birds March 1935
 The Silver Typhoon [Dusty Ayres; Fire-Eyes], (novel) Dusty Ayres and His Battle Birds March 1935
 Ace in the Hole [Dusty Ayres], (short story) Dusty Ayres and His Battle Birds April 1935
 Blind Buzzards [Dusty Ayres], (short story) Dusty Ayres and His Battle Birds April 1935
 The Radio Raider [Dusty Ayres], (short story) Dusty Ayres and His Battle Birds April 1935
 T.N.T. Staffel, (short story) Dare-Devil Aces April 1935
 The Troposphere F-S [Dusty Ayres; Fire-Eyes], (novel) Dusty Ayres and His Battle Birds April 1935
 The Blue Cyclone [Dusty Ayres; Fire-Eyes], (novel) Dusty Ayres and His Battle Birds May/June 1935
 The Looping Blimp [Dusty Ayres], (short story) Dusty Ayres and His Battle Birds May/June 1935
 The Phantom Pilot [Dusty Ayres], (short story) Dusty Ayres and His Battle Birds May/June 1935
 The Slow-Motion Ace [Dusty Ayres], (short story) Dusty Ayres and His Battle Birds May/June 1935
 The Whirlwind Peelot, (short story) Dare-Devil Aces May 1935
 The Outlaw Squadron, (short story) Dare-Devil Aces June 1935
 Key to Murder, (short story) Dime Detective Magazine June 15 1935
 One Minute to Live, (short story) This Week June 23 1935
 Gambling Buzzards [Dusty Ayres], (novelette) Dusty Ayres and His Battle Birds July/August 1935
 The Red Thunderbolt, (short story) Dare-Devil Aces July 1935
 The Telsa Raiders [Dusty Ayres; Fire-Eyes], (novel) Dusty Ayres and His Battle Birds July/August 1935
 The Tin-Fish Ace [Dusty Ayres], (short story) Dusty Ayres and His Battle Birds July/August 1935
 The Boomerang Ace, (short story) Dare-Devil Aces August 1935
 Lose or Else, (short story) Dime Sport Magazine August 1935
 The Crimson Typhoon, (novelette) Dare-Devil Aces September 1935
 Fugitive’s Finish, (short story) Dime Sport Magazine September 1935
 Killer’s Swan Song, (short story) Detective Tales September 1935
 The Living Flame, (novelette) Horror Stories September 1935
 The Soft Eagle, (short story) Sky Fighters October 1935
 The X-Ray Patrol, (short story) Dare-Devil Aces October 1935
 Anchor Man, (short story) Dime Sports Magazine November 1935
 The Buddha Laughs, (short story) The Mysterious Wu Fang November 1935
 Doomed Men, (short story) The Lone Eagle November 1935
 The One-Way Ace, (short story) Dare-Devil Aces November 1935
 Hurdle High Jinks, (short story) Dime Sports Magazine December 1935
 The Typhoon Ace [Happy Harper], (novelette) Dare-Devil Aces December 1935
 Alias the Winner, (short story) Dime Sports Magazine January 1936
 The Gum-Shoe Patrol, (short story) Dare-Devil Aces January 1936
 The Flying Coffin [Kip Lacey], (short story) Dime Detective Magazine February 1936
 Satan’s Ace, (novelette) Dare-Devil Aces February 1936
 Orders for Eagles, (short story) Dare-Devil Aces March 1936
 Sky Vultures, (novelette) Sky Fighters March 1936
 Diving Dynamite, (short story) Thrilling Adventures April 1936
 The Flying Diamond [Kip Lacey], (short story) Dime Detective Magazine April 1936
 The Purple Camel, (short story) Sky Fighters April 1936
 The Sure Thing Ace, (short story) Dare-Devil Aces April 1936
 Medals for Nothing, (short story) Dare-Devil Aces May 1936
 Picture Pilots, (vi) The Lone Eagle May 1936
 Proof Indigo, (short story) G-Men May 1936
 Elementary, My Dear Watson!, (vi) Liberty May 2 1936
 Corpse in Seat 2 [Kip Lacey], (short story) Dime Detective Magazine June 1936
 Hollywood Czar [Dan Fowler], (novella) G-Men June 1936, as by C. K. M. Scanlon
 Hurdle Hoodoo, (short story) Dime Sports Magazine June 1936
 The Miracle Ace, (vi) The Lone Eagle June 1936
 The Riot Act Ace, (short story) Dare-Devil Aces June 1936
 Sing Sing Serenade, (short story) Popular Detective June 1936
 The Thirteenth Fledgling, (short story) Sky Fighters June 1936
 Aces Can Take It, (short story) Dare-Devil Aces July 1936
 Death Banks Left, (short story) Sky Fighters July 1936
 The Other Bullet [Kip Lacey], (short story) Dime Detective Magazine July 1936
 Phony Kill, (short story) Popular Detective July 1936
 Poker Pilots, (vi) The Lone Eagle July 1936
 Trial Horse, (short story) Dime Sports Magazine July 1936
 Fledgling by Request, (short story) Dare-Devil Aces August 1936
 Bench Warmer, (novelette) Thrilling Sports September 1936
 The 4 O’Clock Ace, (short story) Dare-Devil Aces September 1936
 The Home-Made Ace, (short story) Sky Fighters September 1936
 Into Thin Air [Kip Lacey], (short story) Dime Detective Magazine September 1936
 Aces for Sale, (short story) Dare-Devil Aces October 1936
 Fledgling’s First, (vi) The Lone Eagle October 1936
 G Fear, (short story) The Phantom Detective October 1936
 G-Smoke, (short story) G-Men October 1936
 The Ace from Nowheres, (short story) Dare-Devil Aces November 1936
 Aces Even, (short story) Thrilling Adventures November 1936
 Commander Satan, (novella) Sky Fighters November 1936
 Wings Over Somewhere, (novelette) Ace-High Detective Magazine November 1936
 Fledgling, (short story) The Lone Eagle December 1936
 Payroll Player, (short story) Thrilling Sports December 1936
 The Ten Day Eagle, (short story) Dare-Devil Aces December 1936
 A Ticket to Terror [Kip Lacey], (short story) Dime Detective Magazine December 1936
 Aces Take the Air, (short story) Thrilling Adventures January 1937
 Black Vengeance, (short story) Dare-Devil Aces January 1937
 Aces Don’t Count, (short story) Dare-Devil Aces February 1937
 Fokker Finale, (short story) Sky Fighters February 1937
 Generals Shouldn’t Fly, (vi) The Lone Eagle February 1937
 The Man Who Was Two [Kip Lacey], (short story) Dime Detective Magazine February 1937
 The Dead Can’t Fly, (short story) Dare-Devil Aces March 1937
 Ship for Ship, (short story) Sky Fighters March 1937
 Death Takes the Air [Kip Lacey], (short story) Dime Detective Magazine April 1937
 Dive 10, (short story) G-Men April 1937
 No Guns Needed, (vi) The Lone Eagle April 1937
 Scrambled Aces, (short story) Dare-Devil Aces April 1937
 The Big Feller, (novelette) Thrilling Sports May 1937
 C.O.’s Not Wanted, (novelette) Dare-Devil Aces May 1937
 Death Flies East, (short story) The Phantom Detective May 1937
 Hellion’s Wings, (short story) Sky Fighters May 1937
 Bullets for Nothing, (short story) Dare-Devil Aces June 1937
 I Cover the Murder Front, (novella) Black Book Detective Magazine June 1937
 Bullets for Vultures, (short story) Dare-Devil Aces July 1937
 Fledgling’s Finish, (short story) Sky Fighters July 1937
 They Never Forget, (novelette) Thrilling Sports July 1937
 The Phantom Mercedes, (vi) The Lone Eagle August 1937
 The Soaring Screwball, (short story) Popular Sports Magazine August 1937
 The Color Blind Ace, (short story) Sky Fighters September 1937
 Death Below Decks, (short story) G-Men September 1937
 Doom to the Left, (short story) Thrilling Detective October 1937
 Cinder Cyclone, (short story) Dime Sports Magazine November 1937
 The Devil’s Squadron, (novelette) Sky Fighters November 1937
 Murder Takes Wing, (novelette) Popular Detective November 1937
 Nothing Like Experience, (short story) Thrilling Detective November 1937
 You Can’t Die Twice, (short story) Dare-Devil Aces December 1937
 Chiseler’s Patrol, (short story) Sky Fighters January 1938
 The Dead Fly On, (short story) Dare-Devil Aces January 1938
 Prize Title Contest Story, (short story) The Phantom Detective January 1938
 Champion’s Spikes, (short story) Dime Sports Magazine February 1938
 Comet Dust, (short story) Popular Sports Magazine February 1938
 Courage and Wings, (short story) Dare-Devil Aces February 1938
 Murder Ground-Loops, (short story) The Lone Eagle February 1938
 Bullets for the Brave, (short story) Sky Devils March 1938
 The Enemy Is Crazy [Jigger Jones], (short story) Dare-Devil Aces March 1938
 The One Up Ace, (short story) Sky Fighters March 1938
 The Ten-Dollar Hunch, (short story) Popular Detective March 1938
 Aces Be Damned, (short story) Dare-Devil Aces April 1938
 Comet Foam, (short story) Dime Sports Magazine April 1938
 Death Is a Door, (short story) Detective Tales April 1938
 Ghost Hitter, (short story) Popular Sports Magazine April 1938
 Lightning at Second, (novelette) Star Sports Magazine April 1938
 Three Man Patrol, (vi) The Lone Eagle April 1938
 Act of God, (short story) Detective Tales May 1938
 The Cloudy Kid, (short story) Dare-Devil Aces May 1938
 Five Seconds for Murder, (short story) Dime Detective Magazine May 1938
 Fokker Freedom, (short story) Sky Fighters May 1938
 Liquid Lightning, (short story) Thrilling Sports May 1938
 Murder Comes Calling, (short story) Captain Satan May 1938
 One More Win, (short story) Dime Sports Magazine May 1938
 Powder Pilots, (short story) Thrilling Adventures May 1938
 Hellbent for Glory, (short story) Dare-Devil Aces June 1938
 Hold Back the Clock!, (short story) Detective Tales June 1938
 Pylon Pirates, (short story) Popular Sports Magazine June 1938
 Aces Aren’t Born, (short story) Sky Devils July 1938
 The Black Armada, (novelette) Sky Fighters July 1938
 Captain Hornet, (short story) Dare-Devil Aces July 1938
 The Glory Glider, (short story) Thrilling Sports July 1938
 Murder Speaks Twice, (short story) Captain Satan July 1938
 All in the Game, (short story) Popular Sports Magazine August 1938
 Jinx Driver, (short story) Dime Sports Magazine August 1938
 Killer on Wings, (novelette) Dare-Devil Aces August 1938
 The Black Ace Returns (with William Hartley), (short story) Dare-Devil Aces September 1938
 Skirts on the Wing, (short story) Thrilling Sports September 1938
 T-Men Can’t Miss, (short story) The Phantom Detective September 1938
 The Wild Ace, (short story) Sky Fighters September 1938
 Black Lightning, (short story) Dime Sports Magazine October/November 1938
 Doom Down Stairs, (short story) Popular Detective October 1938
 Fokker Filibuster, (short story) The Lone Eagle October 1938
 Fokker Firebrand, (short story) Dare-Devil Aces October 1938
 Just One More Job, (short story) Detective Tales October 1938
 Murder Out of Thin Air [Kip Lacey], (short story) Dime Detective Magazine October 1938
 Tricky Wings, (vi) Sky Devils October 1938
 Breakfast Food for Kidnappers, (short story) Detective Tales November 1938
 Fast Company, (short story) Thrilling Sports November 1938
 Vultures Don’t Forget, (short story) Dare-Devil Aces November 1938
 Greaseballs and Guns, (short story) Dare-Devil Aces December 1938
 Puck Pawn, (short story) Ace Sports December 1938
 The Higher Justice, (short story) Detective Tales January 1939
 Slide, Fate, Slide, (short story) Thrilling Sports January 1939
 The Stairway to Hell, (novella) Dare-Devil Aces January 1939
 Winged Infernos for G.H.Q., (novelette) Sky Devils January 1939
 Burning Blades, (short story) Sports Novels Magazine February/March 1939
 Dead Man’s Patrol, (short story) Dare-Devil Aces February 1939
 Eight Dollar Murder, (short story) Detective Tales February 1939
 Crime Axis, (short story) Popular Detective April 1939
 Death Wears a High Hat, (short story) Dare-Devil Aces April 1939
 Haywire Ace, (short story) The Lone Eagle April 1939
 Smoke Cure for Rats, (short story) Detective Tales April 1939
 The Blimp Butcher, (short story) Dare-Devil Aces May 1939
 Wings from Hell [Happy Harper], (novella) Sky Fighters May 1939
 Infield Fury, (novelette) Super Sports June 1939
 Murder’s Wings Are Black, (short story) Dare-Devil Aces June 1939
 The Devil Flies Alone, (short story) Dare-Devil Aces July 1939
 The Devil’s Courier, (short story) Sky Fighters July 1939
 Flying Whiskers, (short story) Thrilling Sports July 1939
 Speed C.O.D., (short story) Blue Ribbon Sports July 1939
 Eagles May Die!, (short story) Dare-Devil Aces August 1939
 Flight to Glory, (short story) The Lone Eagle August 1939
 Son of the Mound, (short story) Dime Sports Magazine August/September 1939
 Square Wheels, (short story) Popular Sports Magazine August 1939
 Banners of the Brave, (short story) Dare-Devil Aces September 1939
 Sucker Pilot, (short story) Sky Fighters September 1939
 Whacky Waters, (short story) Thrilling Sports September 1939
 Record Wrecker, (short story) Dime Sports Magazine October 1939
 Satan Flies at Night, (short story) Dare-Devil Aces October 1939
 Aces Don’t Forget, (short story) Dare-Devil Aces November 1939
 Aces Don’t Cry, (short story) The Lone Eagle December 1939
 Blood of the Dead, (short story) G-Men January 1940
 Silk Wings, (short story) Thrilling Sports January 1940
 To Hell and Back, (short story) Dare-Devil Aces January 1940
 Wings of Fury, (novella) Sky Fighters January 1940
 Brains Over Ice, (short story) Popular Sports Magazine February 1940
 Last Flight of the Damned, (novella) Battle Birds February 1940
 Murder: Via Airmail, (short story) Air Adventures February 1940
 Sabotage Flight, (short story) The Lone Eagle February 1940
 All Aboard for Doom, (novella) Dare-Devil Aces March 1940
 Death Flies the Sky Route to Berlin, (novella) Fighting Aces March 1940
 Screwball Wings, (short story) Sky Fighters March 1940
 Suckers Fly High, (short story) Black Book Detective Magazine March 1940
 Fokker Fodder, (short story) The Lone Eagle April 1940
 Orders from Headquarters, (column) Captain Combat April 1940, etc., as by Barry Barton
 Petticoat Pilot, (short story) Popular Sports Magazine April 1940
 The Return of the Damned, (novella) Dare-Devil Aces April 1940
 The Sky Beast of Berlin [William Combat (Captain Combat)], (novella) Captain Combat April 1940, as by Barry Barton
 Dictators Be Damned, (novella) Dare-Devil Aces May 1940
 Memory Aces, (short story) Sky Fighters May 1940
 The Roving Renegade, (short story) Thrilling Sports May 1940
 Fledgling Fury, (short story) The Lone Eagle June 1940
 Passport to Doom, (short story) Dare-Devil Aces June 1940
 Red Wings for the Blood Battalion [William Combat (Captain Combat)], (novella) Captain Combat June 1940, as by Barry Barton
 Steel Doom, (short story) Sky Fighters July 1940
 Undersea Raiders, (short story) Thrilling Adventures July 1940
 Low Ceiling for Nazi Hell-Hawks [William Combat (Captain Combat)], (novella) Captain Combat August 1940, as by Barry Barton
 The Pointing Finger, (short story) Detective Novels Magazine August 1940
 Wings for a War-Dog [Red Mulligan], (short story) Dare-Devil Aces August 1940
 Death Has Its Points, (short story) G-Men Detective September 1940
 Eagles Can’t Quit, (short story) Sky Fighters September 1940
 Eagles Play for Keeps, (short story) Fighting Aces September 1940
 Record Wrecker, (short story) Dime Sports Magazine September 1940
 Soldier of the Damned, (short story) Dare-Devil Aces September 1940
 The Tri-Color Eagle, (short story) Air War Fall 1940
 Ball Shy, (short story) Dime Sports Magazine October 1940
 Diamond Destiny, (novelette) Popular Sports Magazine Fall 1940
 The Nazis Be Damned [Red Mulligan], (novelette) Dare-Devil Aces October 1940
 Here Lies a Nazi, (novella) Dare-Devil Aces November 1940
 Heroes Be Damned!, (novella) Dare-Devil Aces December 1940
 Aces Wild, (short story) Sky Fighters January 1941
 Suicide Patrol, (short story) Dare-Devil Aces January 1941
 Truthful Talbot, (short story) Thrilling Sports January 1941
 Eagles Die Twice, (short story) Dare-Devil Aces February 1941
 Poison to Rookies, (short story) Dime Sports Magazine February 1941
 That Kind of a Pilot, (short story) The Lone Eagle February 1941
 Eagles Fight Alone!, (novella) Dare-Devil Aces March 1941
 Pylon Picnic, (short story) Thrilling Sports March 1941
 Sacrifice at Second, (short story) Dime Sports Magazine March 1941
 Six Tickets to Hell, (short story) New Detective Magazine March 1941
 Vultures of the North Sea, (novelette) Sky Fighters March 1941
 Wings of War, (short story) Air War Spring 1941
 Terror Has Swift Wings, (novella) Dare-Devil Aces April 1941
 Come Down Shooting, (short story) Dare-Devil Aces May 1941
 Sky Writin’ Fool, (short story) Sky Fighters May 1941
 Crooks Shouldn’t Fly, (short story) The Lone Eagle June 1941
 France Will Fly Again, (short story) Air War Summer 1941
 Spike-Shy, (short story) Sports Novels Magazine June 1941
 Ambulance Plane Patrol, (novelette) Sky Fighters July 1941
 Dead Men Don’t Fly, (short story) Dare-Devil Aces July 1941
 Bombs with Wings, (short story) The American Eagle August 1941
 The Fighting Canadians, (novella) RAF Aces August 1941
 Bench Manager, (novella) Popular Sports Magazine Fall 1941
 Censored Wings, (short story) Sky Fighters September 1941
 Death Never Bluffs, (short story) G-Men Detective September 1941
 Fight for Your Supper, (novella) Dare-Devil Aces September 1941
 Little Man, What Next?, (short story) Exciting Sports Fall 1941
 Nazi Number Ten, (short story) Air War Fall 1941
 Eagle Wings Over Albania, (short story) The American Eagle October 1941
 The Five-for-One Kid, (short story) Dare-Devil Aces November 1941
 Miracle Wings, (short story) Sky Fighters November 1941
 Bullets Are My Bounty!, (short story) Big-Book Detective Magazine December 1941
 Wings of Sand, (short story) The American Eagle December 1941
 Wings of Vengeance, (short story) Air War Winter 1941/1942
 British Wings, (novella) RAF Aces Winter 1942
 Ground Ace, (short story) Sky Fighters January 1942
 Murder Is My Business, (novelette) New Detective Magazine January 1942
 You Can’t Kill an Eagle, (novelette) Dare-Devil Aces January 1942
 The Devil’s Ante, (short story) Big-Book Detective Magazine February 1942
 And I Mean Bunt!, (short story) Exciting Sports Spring 1942
 Battle Wings, (short story) Air War March 1942
 Get Me an Ace, (short story) Dare-Devil Aces March 1942
 Nazi Vultures, (novelette) Sky Fighters March 1942
 The Vulture of Thermopylae [Jigger Jones], (short story) RAF Aces March 1942
 D as in Dead, (short story) Big-Book Detective Magazine April 1942
 Black Wings of Nippon, (novelette) Sky Fighters May 1942
 The Dead Won’t Help You!, (novella) Dare-Devil Aces May 1942
 They Also Serve, (short story) Air War Spring 1942
 The Two for One Ace, (short story) RAF Aces Spring 1942
 Canadian Wings, (novelette) RAF Aces Summer 1942
 Fielder’s Choice, (novella) Popular Sports Magazine Summer 1942
 Grasshopper Wings, (short story) The American Eagle Summer 1942
 The Hell Diver’s Last Patrol, (short story) Dare-Devil Aces July 1942
 Wings of Victory, (novelette) Sky Fighters July 1942
 You Die Next!, (novelette) New Detective Magazine July 1942
 Last Command, (short story) Air War Summer 1942
 Little Man, You’re Dead, (short story) Big-Book Detective Magazine August 1942
 Blue Water Pilots, (novelette) Army-Navy Flying Stories Fall 1942
 A Messerschmitt for Moscow, (short story) Sky Fighters September 1942
 Strike Down My Killer!, (short story) Dare-Devil Aces September 1942
 Destination—Nippon!, (short story) Dare-Devil Aces November 1942
 Homicide Holiday, (novelette) New Detective Magazine November 1942
 The Navy Way, (short story) Air War Fall 1942
 The Silver Spoon, (short story) Sky Fighters November 1942
 Blue Water Eagles, (short story) Thrilling Adventures December 1942
 Commando Wings, (novelette) RAF Aces Winter 1943
 Malta Masquerade, (novella) Army-Navy Flying Stories Winter 1943
 Blue Water Devils, (short story) Exciting Navy Stories Spring 1943
 A Bullet for the Butcher, (short story) Battle Birds March 1943
 Dive-Bombers Don’t Miss, (short story) Dare-Devil Aces March 1943
 The Major Comes Back, (novella) Popular Sports Magazine Spring 1943
 Aces Come in Pairs, (short story) Fighting Aces May 1943
 The Hawk of Hongkong, (short story) Sky Fighters May 1943
 The Killer of Kalinin, (short story) Air War Spring 1943
 Licked—as in Luftwaffe, (short story) Dare-Devil Aces May 1943
 Aces Win the Hard Way, (novella) Sky Fighters July 1943
 Leatherneck Wings, (short story) Dare-Devil Aces August 1943
 Eagles Fly Back, (novelette) Dare-Devil Aces October 1943
 Happy Landing, (short story) Sky Fighters November 1943
 The Last Dogfight, (short story) Battle Birds November 1943
 Satan Flies No More, (short story) Dare-Devil Aces December 1943
 The Death Watch, (short story) Battle Birds January 1944
 Lightning Over New Guinea, (short story) Army-Navy Flying Stories Winter 1944
 Soldiers Who Never March, (short story) G-Men Detective Winter 1944
 Stolen Wings, (short story) Air War Winter 1944
 Suicide Target, (short story) RAF Aces Winter 1944
 Lair of the Vulture, (novelette) Dare-Devil Aces February 1944
 Airborne!, (novella) Battle Birds March 1944
 Eagles Fly Deep, (novella) Sky Fighters March 1944
 A Kiss for Kiska, (short story) RAF Aces Spring 1944
 Batteries for Today, (novella) Popular Sports Magazine Spring 1944
 The Catapult Plane, (short story) Air War Spring 1944
 Wings Are for the Free, (short story) Battle Birds May 1944
 Dead Engine Johnny, (short story) RAF Aces Summer 1944
 Eagles Don’t Quit, (short story) Dare-Devil Aces June 1944
 Wings for the Dead, (short story) Air War Summer 1944
 Tin Can Doom, (short story) Army-Navy Flying Stories Summer 1944
 Diamond Dynamite, (novelette) Exciting Sports Fall 1944
 Rats Don’t Live Long, (short story) Black Book Detective Fall 1944
 The Eyes of Torpedo 10, (short story) Army-Navy Flying Stories Fall 1944
 Death Flies at Dawn, (short story) Sky Fighters Winter 1945
 Jockey Jinx, (short story) Popular Sports Magazine Winter 1945
 Silver Steel, (short story) Thrilling Sports Winter 1945
 Burma Blitz, (short story) Sky Fighters Spring 1945
 Hot Corner, (novelette) Popular Sports Magazine Spring 1945
 Powerless Pilot, (short story) Army-Navy Flying Stories Spring 1945
 Sighted Sub, Spared Same, (short story) Army-Navy Flying Stories Summer 1945
 Death Chair, (short story) Thrilling Mystery Novel Magazine Summer 1945
 Let Murder Wait, (short story) New Detective Magazine July 1945
 Something Always Happens, (short story) The Phantom Detective August 1945
 Leyte Lullaby, (novelette) Sky Fighters Fall 1945
 See You in the Morgue, (short story) Thrilling Mystery Novel Magazine Fall 1945
 Wings Over the Gridiron, (novelette) Thrilling Football Fall 1945
 Big Moment, (short story) Exciting Sports Fall 1945
 Marked for Murder, (short story) The Phantom Detective October 1945
 If Anything Happens, (short story) Detective Novel Magazine December 1945
 Death Is My Business, (short story) New Detective Magazine January 1946
 Flat-Top Fire-Ball, (short story) Dare-Devil Aces January 1946
 Eagles Fly at Dawn, (short story) Dare-Devil Aces February 1946
 Out of This World, (short story) The Phantom Detective February 1946
 Jungle Wings, (short story) Dare-Devil Aces March 1946
 The Kamikaze Kid, (novelette) Sky Fighters Spring 1946
 Killers Don’t Last, (short story) Thrilling Mystery Novel Magazine March 1946
 Two Birds, One Stone, (short story) G-Men Detective April 1946
 The Ace from Down Under, (short story) Dare-Devil Aces May 1946
 Don’t Spare the Corpses, (short story) New Detective Magazine May 1946
 Killers Can’t Kick, (short story) Black Book Detective Summer 1946
 Let Me Kill You Tenderly [Chet Lacey], (novelette) Popular Detective June 1946
 Mission Completed, (novelette) Sky Fighters Summer 1946
 Wrong-Way Ace, (short story) Dare-Devil Aces July 1946
 Diamond Dust, (short story) Popular Sports Magazine Fall 1946
 Phantom Ace, (short story) Dare-Devil Aces September 1946
 Death Has Red Wings, (short story) Dare-Devil Aces November 1946
 Murder Never Waits, (short story) New Detective Magazine November 1946
 Till Death Do Us Part [Chet Lacey], (novelette) Popular Detective November 1946
 Darling, You Shouldn’t Have! [Chet Lacey], (short story) Popular Detective January 1947
 Pinch Pitcher, (short story) Exciting Sports Winter 1947
 Cinder Lightning, (short story) Popular Sports Magazine Spring 1947
 Mercury Maestro, (short story) Exciting Sports Spring 1947
 Blood on My Wings, (novelette) Sky Fighters Spring 1947
 Death Has No Love-Life [Chet Lacey], (novelette) Popular Detective May 1947
 Flight to Fate, (novelette) Sky Fighters Summer 1947
 You Can’t Run Forever, (short story) Thrilling Sports Summer 1947
 Don’t Give Me That!, (short story) Detective Novel Magazine July 1947
 I’ll See You Burn, (short story) G-Men Detective July 1947
 When in Doubt, Duck!, (short story) The Phantom Detective July 1947
 You Wake Up Dead [Chet Lacey], (novelette) Popular Detective July 1947
 Don’t Give It a Thought, (short story) Thrilling Sports Fall 1947
 The Human Side, (short story) Popular Football Fall 1947
 Make a Miracle, (short story) The Phantom Detective September 1947
 Murder Mustn’t Miss [Chet Lacey], (short story) Popular Detective September 1947
 Never Too Old, (short story) Popular Sports Magazine Fall 1947
 Wings to Burn, (novelette) Sky Fighters Fall 1947
 Nail for a Noose, (short story) Black Book Detective October 1947
 Bullets for Free [Chet Lacey], (short story) Popular Detective January 1948
 Clock Buster, (short story) New Sports Magazine January 1948
 Nobody Likes to Die, (novelette) G-Men Detective January 1948
 Cinder Dust, (short story) Exciting Sports February 1948
 Cinder Smoke, (short story) Fifteen Sports Stories February 1948
 Wings on Ice, (short story) Popular Sports Magazine February 1948
 Don’t Fool with Murder, (short story) Popular Detective March 1948
 Keep Your Gun, (short story) Sky Fighters Spring 1948
 Killers Are Chumps, (short story) G-Men Detective March 1948
 Come-Back, (short story) Exciting Sports April 1948
 Danger—Spikes at Work, (novelette) Popular Sports Magazine April 1948
 Tip from Tinian, (short story) Triple Detective Spring 1948
 And Let That Be a Lesson [Chet Lacey], (short story) Popular Detective May 1948
 Blue Water Cyclone, (short story) New Sports Magazine May 1948
 Mallet Master, (short story) Fifteen Sports Stories May 1948
 You Can’t Beat Class, (novelette) Thrilling Sports May 1948
 Blood on the Throttle, (short story) Sports Novels Magazine June 1948
 A Killer Flies High, (short story) Black Book Detective June 1948
 Tangled Wings, (novelette) Sky Fighters Summer 1948
 Catch Me a Killer [Chet Lacey], (short story) Popular Detective July 1948
 Cyclone on Wheels, (short story) Fifteen Sports Stories July 1948
 Goal Pirate, (short story) Sports Novels Magazine July 1948
 Iron Lightning, (short story) Thrilling Sports July 1948
 Word to the Wise, (short story) G-Men Detective July 1948
 Big Time Boy, (short story) Exciting Sports August 1948
 Blue Water Miracle, (short story) Popular Sports Magazine August 1948
 Guns Are Handy Things [Chet Lacey], (short story) Popular Detective September 1948
 Idea for Murder, (short story) Black Book Detective September 1948
 Mallet Marauder, (short story) Thrilling Sports September 1948
 Operation Fifty Below, (novelette) Sky Fighters Fall 1948
 By Hook or by Crook, (short story) Popular Sports Magazine October 1948
 Rainbow in His Glove, (novelette) Exciting Sports October 1948
 Studio for Killers [Dan Fowler], (novella) G-Men Detective November 1948
 Next Year’s Has-Been, (novelette) Popular Football Winter 1948
 You Never Know, (short story) Exciting Sports December 1948
 Front Page Pilot, (novelette) Sky Fighters Winter 1949
 Hot Iron, (short story) Popular Sports February 1949
 One for the Money, (short story) Exciting Sports February 1949
 The False Face Killer [Dan Fowler], (novella) G-Men Detective March 1949
 One Man’s Loss, (short story) Popular Baseball Spring 1949
 Thunder Sticker, (short story) Fifteen Sports Stories March 1949
 Pennant Pacer, (short story) Super Sports April 1949
 If at First, (short story) Sports Fiction May 1949
 Match Point, (short story) Popular Sports Summer 1949
 Plan for Murder, (short story) The Phantom Detective Summer 1949
 The Glittering Coffins [Dan Fowler], (novella) G-Men Detective Fall 1949
 The Hampered Hurdler, (short story) Exciting Sports Fall 1949
 Kill Me Next Time [Chet Lacey], (short story) Popular Detective September 1949
 Thunder Chucker, (short story) Fifteen Sports Stories November 1949
 Miracle in Lead, (short story) Exciting Sports Winter 1950
 Storm Clouds, (short story) Popular Sports Winter 1950
 A Certain Something, (short story) Thrilling Baseball Spring 1950
 Fixed Fight, (short story) Short Stories March 1950
 A Lot to Learn, (short story) Exciting Baseball Spring 1950
 Midget Mayhem, (short story) Exciting Sports Spring 1950
 Murder Passing Through, (short story) Thrilling Detective April 1950
 Yesterday’s Wings, (short story) Sky Fighters Spring 1950
 The Ghost Pitcher, (novelette) Popular Baseball Summer 1950
 Murder, Collect!, (short story) Famous Detective Stories June 1950
 Man Bait, (short story) The Phantom Detective Summer 1950
 Killing Isn’t Enough, (novelette) Famous Detective Stories August 1950
 Ride the Man Down, (short story) New Sports Magazine August 1950
 One Last Throw, (short story) Popular Football Fall 1950
 Pass and Pray!, (novelette) Thrilling Football Fall 1950
 The Hard-Boiled Coach, (novelette) Exciting Football Fall 1950
 Bunt Crazy, (novelette) Exciting Baseball Spring 1951
 Coach of the Year, (short story) Popular Sports Winter 1951
 It Takes a Champion, (short story) Popular Sports Spring 1951
 Jinx Jet, (short story) G-Men Detective Spring 1951
 Throw Him Curves, (novelette) Thrilling Sports Spring 1951
 Cops Learn Fast, (short story) Short Stories June 1951
 Winner Take Nothing, (short story) Five Sports Classics Magazine Summer 1951
 Lady with a Hunch, (short story) Popular Detective July 1951
 Glory Goal, (short story) Fifteen Sports Stories August 1951
 All-American Chump, (novelette) Thrilling Football Fall 1951
 Money Pitcher, (short story) All Sports September 1951
 Tough Brake, (short story) Detective Book Magazine Winter 1951/1952
 Ten Goal Man, (short story) Super Sports June 1952
 One Man’s Law, (short story) Texas Rangers September 1952
 Rookie on the Hook, (novelette) Super Sports September 1952
 Trail of Desire, (short story) Thrilling Ranch Stories Fall 1952
 Write Your Own Ticket, (short story) Thrilling Football Fall 1952
 Carbon Copy, (novella) Ten Story Sports October 1952
 Pay with Your Heart!, (short story) Rangeland Love Stories October 1952
 Guns in the Dark, (short story) West November 1952
 The Bullet, (short story) The Rio Kid Western January 1953
 Dead and Gone, (short story) Thrilling Detective Winter 1953
 Girl in Trouble, (short story) Black Book Detective Winter 1953
 Pennant for a Lady, (short story) Exciting Baseball Spring 1953
 Drop Dead, (short story) The Phantom Detective Spring 1953
 Glory Ropes a Wild One, (short story) Rangeland Romances May 1953
 Dope in the Dark, (short story) Dime Detective Magazine June 1953
 Dead Wrong, (short story) Triple Detective Summer 1953
 Gambler’s Pot, (short story) Double Action Western September 1953
 Shot in the Dark, (short story) The Saint Detective Magazine March 1955
 You’ll Be Back, (short story) The Pursuit Detective Story Magazine #17, September 1956
 Dig This Knife, (short story) Guilty Detective Story Magazine January 1958
 Payoff for Goldie, (short story) Trapped Detective Story Magazine February 1958
 Move In, Take Over, (short story) Guilty Detective Story Magazine March 1958
 I Can’t Die Now, (short story) Guilty Detective Story Magazine May 1958
 Chicken Blood, (novelette) Guilty Detective Story Magazine July 1958
 Dig That Ice!, (novelette) Guilty Detective Story Magazine September 1958
 The Jungle of the Streets, (novelette) Trapped Detective Story Magazine October 1958
 Real Easy Pushover, (novelette) Guilty Detective Story Magazine November 1958
 I Hate That Chick, (novelette) Trapped Detective Story Magazine June 1959
 Kid-Gang Violence, (novelette) Guilty Detective Story Magazine July 1959
 Deadly Queen of the Kid-Gang, (novelette) Trapped Detective Story Magazine August 1959
 Kill the One You Love, (novelette) Guilty Detective Story Magazine September 1960
 Be Yellow or Die, (short story) Trapped Detective Story Magazine February 1961
 A Knife in the Night, (novelette) Trapped Detective Story Magazine November 1961
 The Switchblade Knife, (novel) Guilty Detective Story Magazine December 1962
 How Dusty Ayres Was Born, (letter)
 Mercy Planes, (novella)

Notes

External links
 
 
 
 Dusty Ayres and his Battle Birds

1900 births
1977 deaths
American children's writers
People from Wilton, Connecticut
American Field Service personnel of World War I